Shiv Kapur (born 12 February 1982) is an Indian professional golfer. He is recipient of 2002 Arjuna Award.

Amateur career
Kapur went to Purdue University and played the amateur circuit in the United States. He had a successful amateur career, winning the Indian and Malaysian Amateur Opens in 2000 and an individual gold medal at the 2002 Asian Games.

Professional career
Kapur turned professional in 2004 and made a considerable impact in his second season on the Asian Tour by winning the season ending Volvo Masters of Asia and finishing the year fourth on the Asian Tour Order of Merit. Kapur works with instructor Peter Murphy out of Dallas, Texas.

He joined the European Tour in 2007, having earned enough as an affiliate member in 2006 to merit a tour card. His best finish that season came at the Enjoy Jakarta Astro Indonesia Open, where he finished tied for second place.

Kapur's best opportunity at clinching a European Tour victory came at the 2009 South African Open Championship. He lost in a playoff to Richie Ramsay.

Amateur wins
2000 Indian Amateur Open, Malaysian Amateur Open
2002 Asian Games Individual Gold Medal

Professional wins (8)

Asian Tour wins (3)

1Co-sanctioned by the Professional Golf Tour of India

Asian Tour playoff record (0–2)

Challenge Tour wins (2)

1Co-sanctioned by the Professional Golf Tour of India

Professional Golf Tour of India wins (3)

1Co-sanctioned by the Challenge Tour
2Co-sanctioned by the Asian Tour

Other wins (2)

Playoff record
European Tour playoff record (0–1)

Results in major championships

CUT = missed the half-way cut
"T" = tied

Results in World Golf Championships

Team appearances
Amateur
Eisenhower Trophy (representing India): 2000, 2002
Bonallack Trophy (representing Asia/Pacific): 2002 (winners), 2004 (winners)

See also
2013 Challenge Tour graduates

References

External links

Indian male golfers
Purdue Boilermakers men's golfers
Asian Tour golfers
European Tour golfers
Golfers at the 2002 Asian Games
Medalists at the 2002 Asian Games
Asian Games gold medalists for India
Asian Games medalists in golf
Golfers from Delhi
Recipients of the Arjuna Award
People from New Delhi
1982 births
Living people